Masaurhi Assembly constituency is one of 243 constituencies of legislative assembly of Bihar. It comes under Pataliputra (Lok Sabha constituency) along with other assembly constituencies viz. Danapur, Maner, Phulwari, Paliganj and Bikram. It is reserved for scheduled castes.

Overview
Masaurhi comprises CD Blocks Masaurhi & Dhanarua.

Members of Legislative Assembly

Election results

2020

2015

2010

See also
 List of Assembly constituencies of Bihar
 Masaurhi

References

External links
 

Assembly constituencies in Patna district
Politics of Patna district
Assembly constituencies of Bihar